Johnny Madsen (born in Thyborøn, Denmark on 31 March 1951) is a Danish musician, songwriter and painter. In the period 1983 to 1992, he was part of Dalton, a supergroup trio made of Madsen, Lars Lilholt and Allan Olsen. Johnny Madsen is living on the island of Fanø, where he has his own art gallery "Madsens Malerier". He has also been part of Hobo Ekspressen.

Painting 
Johnny Madsen has been painting for many years, mostly inspired by expressionism and has mentioned Vincent van Gogh and Jens Søndergaard as inspirations. Madsen has exhibited in numerous galleries and at many events across Denmark and selected paintings are on permanent display at his art gallery on Fanø. In 2007, he published the book "Hvorom alting er", discussing the artistic process as he sees it, and showing a few of his own works. The book has only been printed in limited copies, with a few translated to English titled "By all means".

Discography

Solo
Studio albums
1982: De tørre er de best... men våde er de flest
1986: Madsens septiktanker
1987: Chinatown, Yellow Moon og den sorte fugl
1988: Udenfor sæsonen
1989: Nattegn
1991: Bounty Blue
1994: Ses vi i Slesvig
1997: Room Service (1997)
1998: The Blues
1999: Checkpoint Charlie
2001: Den blinde lotterisælger
2003: Regnmanden
2007: Spidsen af kuglen
2011: Le New York
2015: Godt nyt

Live albums
1992: Halgal Halbal (double CD)

Compilation albums
1996: Madsens bedste – 40 af de fede (double CD)
2004: Madsen – på den anden side  
2007: De Tørre & de bedste (double CD + DVD)

Dalton
Albums
1992: Dalton
2009: Tyve Ti
2010: Var Her (Live 2 CDs +DVD) (with Allan Olsen and Lars Lilholt)

References

Sources 
 Johnny Madsen
 Madsens Galleri

External links
Official website

Danish rock musicians
Danish songwriters
Danish male singers
1951 births
Living people
People from Lemvig Municipality